Naadody is a 1992 Indian Malayalam-language action drama film produced and directed by Thampi Kannanthanam and written by T. A. Razzaq. It stars Mohanlal in the lead role, alongside Suresh Gopi, Babu Antony, N. N. Pillai, Jagathy Sreekumar, Kuthiravattam Pappu, Jose Pellissery, Sathaar, Mohini, Sangita Madhavan Nair, and Baby Vichitra. The music was composed by S. P. Venkatesh. The film was dubbed and released in Telugu as Brahmarudrudu.

Plot 

Sachidanandan comes to the hill station searching for Andrew in search of a promised job. He meets Sophy there and rescues a small girl from drowning. He then meets Menon, the child's Grand Father. Menon is a millionaire and Sophy is the Nanny who looks after his grand daughter, his sole heir. Sivan is Menon's nephew who draws a plot to get all the money from Menon and marry Sophy. He takes the help of Jackson,his horse trainer, to complete his plan. But Jackson had other plans.

Cast 
 Mohanlal as Sachidanandan and Balakrishnan Bhagavathar (dual role)
 Mohini as Sophy Ninan Varghese
 Suresh Gopi as Shivan
 N. N. Pillai as Prabhakara Menon
 Babu Antony as Jackson
 Jagathy Sreekumar as Kunjikuttan Nair
 Kuthiravattam Pappu as Kutty
 Jose Pellissery as Narayanan
 Sangita as Sindhu, Sachidanandan's step-sister
 Sathaar as Police Officer
 Baby Vichithra as Chinnu Mol
 Prathapachandran as Ninan Varghese, Sophy's father
 Nandhu as Villager
 Ravi Menon as Doctor
 Silk Smitha as Item girl (Cameo appearance)
 Chithra as Susheela, Balakrishnan's wife and Sachidanandan's mother (Cameo appearance)
 Rupini as Meera Nair, Balakrishnan's wife and Sindhu's mother (Cameo appearance)

Production 
For an emotional scene in the film taking place after the conversation between Mohanlal and N. N. Pillai, director Kannanthanam challenged Mohanlal to cry without using Glycerine. Ultimately, Mohanlal won the bet. During the shooting of this film, Babu Antony fell head first into a glass panel and started bleeding.

Soundtrack 
The film features original soundtrack composed by S. P. Venkatesh. Released on 15 July 1992 by Ranjini Cassettes.

References

External links 

1992 films
1990s Malayalam-language films
Films directed by Thampi Kannanthanam